Betroka is a district of Anosy in Madagascar.

Communes
The district is further divided into 20 communes:

 Ambalasoa
 Ambatomivary
 Analamary
 Andriandampy
 Beapombo I
 Beapombo II
 Bekorobo
 Benato-Toby
 Betroka
 Iaborotra
 Ianabinda
 Ianakafy
 Isoanala
 Ivahona
 Jangany
 Mahabo
 Mahasoa Est
 Nagnarena
 Naninora
 Tsaraitso

Rivers
The Mangoky River and its affluents (Imaloto, Sakamahily, Sakory, Ihazototsy) is the main river system in the district of Betroka.

References 

Districts of Anosy